Rebecca "Bec" Cole (born 19 March 1992) is an Australian professional basketball player.  Cole is a starting shooting guard for the Southside Flyers in the WNBL, and has been a member of both the Australian 3x3 national team and the Australian Opals.

Early life
Cole was born on 19 March 1992 in Mount Waverley, Victoria. She is the daughter of Gary and Ros Cole and has two older sisters, Jessica and Emma.

Cole began her career playing for the Australian Institute of Sport (AIS) at the age of 16.

Professional career

WNBL
Cole  made her Women's National Basketball League debut with the AIS in 2009–10 season at 16 years old.

Her professional career  began when she moved to the Bulleen Boomers in the 2012–13 season. She re-signed with rebranded Melbourne Boomers for the 2013–14 season. In the 2014–15 season, and was named the Round 12 Player of the Week.

Cole remained with the Boomers through the 2016–17 season.

Following the 2018–19 season, Cole signed with the Dandenong Rangers at shooting guard.

In January 2019, she was named to the 2018–19 WNBL All-Star Five for the first time in her career. Cole was also announced as the Rangers 2018–19 MVP.

Following the 2019–20 season, the Rangers rebranded to the Southside Flyers, where she committed for the 2019–20 to 2020–21 season. As of 2022 her name is still on their website.

FIBA 3x3
Cole was a member of both the 2018 and 2019 Australian teams in the FIBA 3x3 Asia Cup. In 2018, Australia won bronze and in 2019 Australia went undefeated winning the gold medal, with Cole being named the MVP of the 2019 tournament.

National team
Youth Level
Cole made her international debut with the Under-19 program in 2011. Cole was chosen as captain for the Australian Gems (Australia's Under 19 Women's Team) at the FIBA Under-19 World Championship in Chile, where Australia narrowly missed out on bronze, placing fourth.  Cole played all eight games.

Senior Level
In January 2019 it was announced that Cole was part of the 2019 Opals squad.

Recognition

In the 2018–19 season, Cole was awarded runner-up for WNBL Most Valuable Player Award and was selected in the WNBL All-Star team.

FIBA named Cole one of the "10 Women Who Defined 3x3 in 2019".

Other roles
 Cole is the Ambassador for Lymphoma Australia.

References

External links

1992 births
Australian women's basketball players
Guards (basketball)
Sportswomen from Victoria (Australia)
Australian Institute of Sport basketball (WNBL) players
Living people
Dandenong Rangers players
Melbourne Boomers players
People from Mount Waverley, Victoria
Basketball players from Melbourne
People educated at Caulfield Grammar School